Dewi, Dai, Dafydd or David James may refer to:

Performers
David James (actor, born 1839) (1839–1893), English stage comic and a founder of London's Vaudeville Theatre
David James (actor, born 1967) (born 1967), Australian presenter of ABC's Play School
David James (actor, born 1972) (born 1972), South African who played Koobus Venter in 2009 film District 9
David James (singer), Canadian country music songwriter since 2013

Public officials
David James (American politician) (1843–1921), member of Wisconsin State Senate
David James (Australian politician) (1854–1926), member of South Australia House of Assembly
David James (British MP) (1919–1986), member of Conservative Party, notable for escape from POW camp
David James, Baron James of Blackheath (born 1937), English corporate trouble-shooter, author of Conservative Party's James Report

Scientists
David Gwilym James (1905–1968), Welsh vice chancellor of University of Southampton
David James (cell biologist) (born 1958), Australian scientist who discovered glucose transporter GLUT4
David James, British astronomer and minor planet discoverer

Sportsmen
David James (cricketer, born 1791) (1791–1846), English player recorded in two matches for Old Etonians
David James (rugby, born 1866) (1866–1929), Welsh halfback
Dai James (1899—after 1929), Welsh footballer with Aberdare Athletic and Brighton & Hove Albion
David James (rugby, born 1906) (1906–1981), Welsh rugby union and rugby league hooker
David James (footballer, born 1917) (1917–1981), Welsh centre forward
David James (cricketer, born 1921) (1921–2002), Welsh right-handed batsman
David James (footballer, born 1942), Scottish winger
Dave James, American NASCAR racer in 1969 Motor Trend 500
David James (sailor) (born 1949), American Olympian in 1968
David James (footballer, born 1970), English goalkeeper
Dafydd James (born 1975), Welsh rugby union wing and centre
David James (rugby, born 1985), Welsh wing and fullback

Others
David James (painter) (1853–1904), English marine painter
David James (bishop) (born 1945), English bishop of Bradford
Dewi James, Welsh businessman, co-founder in 1984 of American pornographic film company Vivid Entertainment, a/k/a David James

See also

James David (disambiguation)